Gridlock is the inability to move on a transport network.

Gridlock may also refer to:
 Gridlock (politics), a situation when the government is unable to act or pass laws because rival parties control different parts of the executive branch and the legislature.
 Gridlock (novel), a novel by Ben Elton
 Gridlock (band), an electronic music band
 Gridlock (game show), a 1990s game show in Ireland
 Gridlock (board game)
 "Gridlock", a song by The Pogues from the album Peace and Love
 "Gridlock", a song by Anthrax from the album Persistence of Time
 "Gridlock!", a song by Electric Six from the album Heartbeats and Brainwaves
 Gridlock, a 1996 TV movie starring David Hasselhoff
 Gridlock'd, a 1997 film
 "Gridlock" (Doctor Who), an episode of Doctor Who
 "Gridlock", a music video by Angry Kid
 Gridlock (film), a 1980 film
 Gridlock!, a pricing game on the game show The Price Is Right